YEPP may refer to:

Youth of the European People's Party
Samsung YEPP, Samsung's digital audio player